Mark A. Strong is an American politician serving as a member of the Utah House of Representatives from the 41st district. Elected in November 2018, he assumed office on January 2, 2019.

Education 
Strong earned a Bachelor of Arts degree in communications with an emphasis in public relations from Brigham Young University.

Career 
Since 1994, he has worked as a sales manager at HOJ Innovations, an industrial equipment wholesaler. Strong was elected to the Utah House of Representatives in November 2018 and assumed office on January 2, 2019. In December 2019, Strong advocated for a Convention of States.

During the 2022 legislative session, Strong served on the Higher Education Appropriations Subcommittee, House Business and Labor Committee, and the House Revenue and Taxation Committee.

References 

Living people
Republican Party members of the Utah House of Representatives
Brigham Young University alumni
Year of birth missing (living people)